The 1935 All-Ireland Senior Camogie Championship Final was the fourth All-Ireland Final and the deciding match of the 1935 All-Ireland Senior Camogie Championship, an inter-county camogie tournament for the top teams in Ireland.

The home team won by a single point.

References

All-Ireland Senior Camogie Championship Final
All-Ireland Senior Camogie Championship Final
All-Ireland Senior Camogie Championship Finals
Cork county camogie team matches